Flag Hill is the highest hill on East Wallabi Island, and the highest point in the Houtman Abrolhos, an archipelago off the coast of Western Australia. It is about 15 metres (50 ft) high.

Although East Wallabi Island was extensively explored by survivors of the 1629 Batavia shipwreck, no records of that event refer specifically to Flag Hill. Accordingly, discovery of the hill is attributed to John Clements Wickham, Commander during the third voyage of HMS Beagle, which surveyed East Wallabi Island in May 1840. Wickham's lieutenant, John Lort Stokes, later wrote: 
No explanation for the name "Flag Hill" was given.

From the peak of Flag Hill, Wickham's party sighted an island to the north-north-west; they would later visit it and name it North Island.

References

Houtman Abrolhos
Mountains of Western Australia
Wallabi Group